Hollandic or Hollandish is the most widely spoken dialect of the Dutch language. Hollandic is among the Central Dutch dialects. Other important language varieties of spoken Low Franconian languages are Brabantian, Flemish (East Flemish, West Flemish), Zeelandic, Limburgish and Surinamese Dutch.

History

Originally in the later County of Holland, Old Frisian or a related Ingvaeonic dialect was spoken. There is no evidence for the theory that migrating Low Franconian settlers were responsible for the change to Old Dutch in the 12th and 13th centuries. Instead, long-term language contact between Frisian speakers and Frankish speakers before the 12th century could have led to a Hollandic dialect that was partly Low Franconian and partly influenced by Frisian.

In the 16th century, Dutch was standardised, with the Brabantian dialect of Antwerp being the most influential one, according to many linguists. The written language of the County of Holland, which was the most urbanised area in Europe, began to imitate the Brabantian standard.

During the Eighty Years' War, especially after 1585, the Sack of Antwerp and the 1580s successes of the Duke of Parma made between 100,000 and 200,000 of Brabantish and Flemish, many Calvinist, settle in the cities of Holland proper. The refugees caused a mixture of their dialects with those of the people who were already there. The new language replaced most of the original Hollandic dialects with Brabantian influences and further diluted the Frisian influences on Dutch.

That certainly slowed linguistic change by the influence on spoken language of the very conservative written standard. As a result, Standard Dutch has kept many features of late-16th-century Brabantian.

Distance from standard language
The colloquial Dutch in Holland proper (the area of the old County of Holland), particularly the Hollandic now spoken in some urban areas, is closer to Standard Dutch than anywhere else.

Shades of other dialects
In Friesland, there are areas and cities in which Hollandic is spoken but strongly influenced by West Frisian. In the north of North Holland, especially in the region of West Friesland,  Scheveningen, Katwijk and other coastal places, the original West Frisian substratum of the Hollandic dialect is still an important part of the local West Frisian dialect group.

In Zaanstreek (central North Holland), a traditional region, the old Hollandic dialect, Zaans, is still found but with little West Frisian influence. Some words are similar because of the influence of migrating West Frisian farmers in the 13th to the 15th centuries. Zaans can be seen as one of the few (together with Westfries) and oldest original Hollandic dialects and is still spoken today, like the old Waterlands dialect, which exists as well in Volendam. Both Zaans and Waterlands are unintelligible for someone who does not come from that region in North Holland. However, people who speak Zaans, West Frisian or Waterlands are able to understand one another better than outsiders because all three dialects use similar words.

On the South Holland island of Goeree-Overflakkee, Zeelandic is spoken. In the east and south, the Hollandic dialects gradually become Brabantian forms like the South Guelderish. Utrechts-Alblasserwaards, spoken in the area immediately east of the coastal districts, is considered to be a subdialect of Hollandic or a separate dialect.

List of subdialects
 Amsterdams
 Kennemerlands
 South Hollandic
 Dordts
 The Hague dialect
 Leids
 Rotterdams
 Utrechts-Alblasserwaards
 Westhoeks
 Westlands
 West Frisian
 Waterlands and Volendams
 Zaans
 Huizers

Related varieties
 Bildts, Midslands, Stadsfries, and Amelands
 East Brabantian

References

Dutch dialects
Languages of the Netherlands
Holland